The 2019 Internazionali di Tennis d'Abruzzo was a professional tennis tournament played on clay courts. It was the third edition of the tournament which was part of the 2019 ATP Challenger Tour. It took place in Francavilla al Mare, Italy between 22 and 28 April 2019.

Singles main-draw entrants

Seeds

 1 Rankings are as of 15 April 2019.

Other entrants
The following players received wildcards into the singles main draw:
  Jacopo Berrettini
  Gianluca Di Nicola
  Lorenzo Musetti
  Julian Ocleppo
  Giulio Zeppieri

The following players received entry into the singles main draw using their ITF World Tennis Ranking:
  Javier Barranco Cosano
  Riccardo Bonadio
  Raúl Brancaccio
  Ivan Nedelko
  David Pérez Sanz

The following player received entry into the singles main draw as an alternate:
  Antoine Escoffier

The following players received entry from the qualifying draw:
  Lý Hoàng Nam
  Andrea Vavassori

The following player received entry as a lucky loser:
  Andrea Del Federico

Champions

Singles

 Stefano Travaglia def.  Oscar Otte 6–3, 6–7(3–7), 6–3.

Doubles

 Denys Molchanov /  Igor Zelenay def.  Guillermo Durán /  David Vega Hernández 6–3, 6–2.

References

2019 ATP Challenger Tour
2019 in Italian tennis
April 2019 sports events in Italy
Internazionali di Tennis d'Abruzzo